Dora is a 1933 British comedy film directed by St. John Legh Clowes. It was designed to humorously highlight some of the bizarre regulations of the Defence of the Realm Act 1914 (known as DORA), drawn up during the First World War, but still enforced. In a series of incidents the restrictions of the Act are witnessed by a bemused American tourist.

Cast
 Sydney Fairbrother as Mother  
 Moore Marriott as Thomas Henry Jones  
 Dodo Watts as Jean  
 Kenneth Kove as Chemist 
 St. John Legh Clowes 
 A. Bromley Davenport as Judge  
 Wally Patch as PC William Petty  
 Minnie Rayner as Customer  
 Frank Stanmore as Jupiter  
 Hal Walters as Newsagent

References

Bibliography
 Chibnall, Steve. Quota Quickies: The Birth of the British 'B' film. British Film Institute, 2007.

External links

1933 films
British comedy films
1933 comedy films
Quota quickies
Films set in England
British black-and-white films
1930s English-language films
1930s British films